John MacDonald (1727–1779) was a Roman Catholic bishop who served as the Vicar Apostolic of the Highland District of Scotland.

Born in Ardnamurchan, Argyllshire in 1727, he was ordained a priest on 1 April 1752. He was appointed the Coadjutor Vicar Apostolic of the Highland District and Titular Bishop of Tiberiopolis by the Holy See on 25 February 1761. He was consecrated to the Episcopate at Preshome on 27 September 1761. The principal consecrator was Bishop Hugh MacDonald, and the principal co-consecrators were Bishop Alexander Smith and Bishop James Grant. On the death of Bishop MacDonald on 12 March 1773, he automatically succeeded as the Vicar Apostolic of the Highland District. He died in office on 9 May 1779, aged 52.

References

1727 births
1779 deaths
Apostolic vicars of Scotland
18th-century Roman Catholic bishops in Scotland
People from Argyll and Bute